Lee Jun-hyeob (born 30 March 1989) is a South Korean football player who plays for National Defense Ministry as a forward.

Club career

Kwandong University
In university level, he and his university team that consist of freshman and sophomore student consecutively won the university championship of freshman and sophomore in 2009 spring and autumn competition.

Gangwon FC
He parted 2010 K-League draft, but he wasn't called any clubs in 2010 K-League draft. Lee was joined Gangwon FC lately in the preseason. His first K-League match was against Seongnam Ilhwa Chunma in Seongnam that Gangwon lose by 0–3 in away game by substitute on 27 February 2010.

Eintracht Braunschweig
During the second half of the 2013–14 Regionalliga season, Lee played for the reserve side of Eintracht Braunschweig in Germany.

Terengganu
On 4 February 2018, Lee signed a one-year contract with Malaysia Super League club Terengganu FC I, scoring his first goal with the club on 23 Feb 2018. He was later transferred to Terengganu's developmental team, Terengganu FC II on April the same year. He was released from his contract with Terengganu in June 2018.

Club statistics

References

External links

 

1989 births
Living people
Association football forwards
South Korean footballers
South Korean expatriate footballers
South Korean expatriate sportspeople in Germany
South Korean expatriate sportspeople in Japan
Ulsan Hyundai Mipo Dockyard FC players
Gangwon FC players
Gangneung City FC players
Eintracht Braunschweig II players
Matsumoto Yamaga FC players
K League 1 players
Korea National League players
J2 League players
Expatriate footballers in Germany
Expatriate footballers in Japan
Expatriate footballers in Cambodia